Zdravko Drinčić (Cyrillic: Здравко Дринчић; born 1 May 1972) is a Montenegrin former professional footballer who played as a forward. He represented VfL Bochum for three seasons, including two in the Bundesliga.

Career
Drinčić made his debut with hometown club Sutjeska Nikšić in the 1989–90 Yugoslav Second League. He then moved to Rad and scored once in the first half of the 1990–91 Yugoslav First League. In early 1991, Drinčić rejoined Sutjeska Nikšić and scored once in the second half of the 1990–91 Yugoslav Second League. He later returned to Rad and played regularly in the First League of FR Yugoslavia, scoring 23 more goals (1992–1995).

In July 1995, Drinčić moved abroad and joined Swiss club Neuchâtel Xamax, appearing in one league game. He subsequently switched to Spanish side Osasuna and played there until the end of the year. In early 1996, Drinčić returned to FR Yugoslavia and joined Vojvodina. He spent two and a half years at the club, helping them reach the 1998 UEFA Intertoto Cup finals.

References

External links
 
 
 
 

1972 births
Living people
Footballers from Nikšić
Association football forwards
Yugoslav footballers
Montenegrin footballers
Serbia and Montenegro footballers
FK Sutjeska Nikšić players
FK Rad players
Neuchâtel Xamax FCS players
CA Osasuna players
FK Vojvodina players
VfL Bochum players
SV Waldhof Mannheim players
Panachaiki F.C. players
Yugoslav Second League players
Yugoslav First League players
First League of Serbia and Montenegro players
Swiss Super League players
Segunda División players
Bundesliga players
2. Bundesliga players
Super League Greece players
Serbia and Montenegro expatriate footballers
Expatriate footballers in Switzerland
Serbia and Montenegro expatriate sportspeople in Switzerland
Expatriate footballers in Spain
Serbia and Montenegro expatriate sportspeople in Spain
Expatriate footballers in Germany
Serbia and Montenegro expatriate sportspeople in Germany
Expatriate footballers in Greece
Serbia and Montenegro expatriate sportspeople in Greece